Shuswap is a provincial electoral district for the Legislative Assembly of British Columbia, Canada.

It is the successor riding to the old Salmon Arm riding. For other historical and current federal and provincial ridings in the Shuswap-Kamloops-North Okanagan, please see Kamloops (provincial electoral district), Kamloops (electoral district) and Okanagan (electoral districts). All ridings in the southern BC region are "descendants" of the original Yale provincial riding.

Demographics

Geography
As of the 2020 provincial election, Shuswap comprises the western portion of the Columbia-Shuswap Regional District and the northwestern portion of the Regional District of North Okanagan. It is located in southern British Columbia. Communities in the electoral district consist of Salmon Arm, Armstrong, Spallumcheen, Enderby, and Sicamous.

History

1999 Redistribution

Members of Legislative Assembly 
This riding has elected the following Members of Legislative Assembly:

Election results 

|-

|NDP
|Steve Gunner
|align="right"|7,051
|align="right"|30.54%
|align="right"|
|align="right"|$41,011

| Conservative
| Beryl Ludwig
|align="right"|2,374
|align="right"|10.28%
|align="right"|
|align="right"|$9,378

|}

|NDP
|Wayne Fowler
|align="right"|3,788
|align="right"|16.46%
|align="right"|$12,950

|No Affiliation
|Jeanette (N.O.) McLennan
|align="right"|119
|align="right"|0.52%
|align="right"|$100

|}

|-

|NDP
|Calvin White
|align="right"|7,869
|align="right"|31.63%
|align="right"|
|align="right"|$37,552
|-

|No Affiliation
|Gordon Campbell
|align="right"|810
|align="right"|3.26%
|align="right"|
|align="right"|

|Independent
|Merv Ritchie
|align="right"|204
|align="right"|0.82%
|align="right"|
|align="right"|$505

|}

|-

|NDP
|Shannon O'Neill
|align="right"|7,687
|align="right"|35.50%
|align="right"|
|align="right"|$33,572

|-

|}

References

External links 
BC Stats Profile - 2001 (pdf)
Results of 2001 election (pdf)
2001 Expenditures
Results of 1996 election
1996 Expenditures
Results of 1991 election
1991 Expenditures
Website of the Legislative Assembly of British Columbia

British Columbia provincial electoral districts
Salmon Arm